Charles Vardis (16 October 1985 – 19 September 2021) was a Ghanaian professional footballer who played as a defensive midfielder.

Club career
Vardis moved in summer 2008 from Hearts of Oak  to Maccabi Herzliya F.C. on loan. He played for Hearts of Oak in the CAF Champions League and joined in summer 2009 newly promoted Ghana Premier League club New Edubiase United.

International career
In 2006, Vardis was first called for the Black Meteors.

Death
Vardis died on 19 September 2021.

References

External links
 

1985 births
2021 deaths
Ghanaian footballers
Association football midfielders
Ghana international footballers
Accra Hearts of Oak S.C. players
Maccabi Herzliya F.C. players
New Edubiase United F.C. players
Ghanaian expatriate footballers
Ghanaian expatriate sportspeople in Israel
Expatriate footballers in Israel